Foursquare Swarm is a mobile app that allows users to share their locations with their friends and create a record of their experiences in a personal lifelog. Swarm launched for iOS and Android devices on May 15, 2014. A spin-off from and companion app to Foursquare City Guide, Swarm allows users to check-in to a given location, and see who is nearby. These check-ins are chronologically listed to create a personal lifelog for each user, which serves as a digital library for all the places they have been, in a searchable database that can be revisited and shared.

Location and check-in data collected in Swarm are used to improve a user's recommendations in Foursquare City Guide. Splitting check-ins and general location sharing in to the separate Swarm app was designed to let the main Foursquare app focus on exploring and discovering information on locations, in a Yelp-like fashion. Swarm supports checking in with photos or stickers attached to it, and allows broadcasting of check-ins to other social networks including Facebook and Twitter. Swarm features include a shareable interactive personalized map, and unique stats like total lifetime check-ins, number of unique categories visited, and data on streaks and Foursquare 'mayorships' (a feature of the platforms gamification elements).

Features
Swarm 5.0, released on iOS August 8, 2017 and on Android August 16, 2017, was the most significant update to the app’s core functionality since launching in 2014, focusing more on lifelogging.

Major features include check-ins, messaging, stickers, challenges, 'mayorships', history search, and merchandise.

Reception
CNET described the app as a "bold move", and praised it for removing some of the "clutter" of Foursquare and focusing on letting the user "quickly see where your friends are and make plans". The redesign was unpopular with some existing Foursquare users, who complained about its lack of gamification elements, and the need to download two apps for what used to be contained in a single Foursquare app.

References

External links 
 
 What is Swarm?, Foursquare Help Center

IOS software
Android (operating system) software
2014 software
Windows Phone software
Geosocial networking